The canton of Saint-Junien is an administrative division of the Haute-Vienne department, western France. It was created at the French canton reorganisation which came into effect in March 2015. Its seat is in Saint-Junien.

It consists of the following communes:
 
Chaillac-sur-Vienne
Javerdat
Oradour-sur-Glane
Saillat-sur-Vienne
Saint-Brice-sur-Vienne
Saint-Junien
Saint-Martin-de-Jussac
Saint-Victurnien

References

Cantons of Haute-Vienne